The 1999 Stuttgart Masters (known as the Eurocard Open for sponsorship reasons) was a men's tennis tournament played on indoor hard courts. It was the 4th edition of the Stuttgart Masters, and was part of the ATP Super 9 of the 1999 ATP Tour. It took place at the Schleyerhalle in Stuttgart, Germany, from 25 October through 31 October 1999. Thomas Enqvist, seeded 13th, won the singles title.

Finals

Singles

 Thomas Enqvist defeated  Richard Krajicek 6–1, 6–4, 5–7, 7–5
It was Enqvist's 2nd title of the year and his 15th overall. It was his 1st Super 9 title of the year, and his 2nd overall.

Doubles

 Jonas Björkman /  Byron Black defeated  David Adams /  John-Laffnie de Jager 6–7(6–8), 7–6(7–2), 6–0

References

External links
 ITF tournament edition details

 
Eurocard Open